Abbas Massoudi (Persian: عباس مسعودی) (1895–17 June 1974) was an Iranian politician and journalist. He was for several periods a member of the National Consultative Assembly and Senate of Iran during the Pahlavi dynasty. While he is best known as the founder of the Ettela'at which is the oldest Iranian daily newspaper that is still running.

Biography
When in 1949 the Senate of Iran was formed, Abbas Massoudi was elected and remained as Senator for the rest of his life.

References

1895 births

1974 deaths

20th-century newspaper founders
Iranian magazine founders
Politicians from Tehran